Victor Frederick of Anhalt-Bernburg (20 September 1700–18 May 1765), was a German prince of the House of Ascania. He was Reigning prince of the principality of Anhalt-Bernburg from 1721 to 1765.

Life
Victor Frederick was born on 20 September 1700 in Bernburg as the second (but eldest and only surviving) son of Karl Frederick, Prince of Anhalt-Bernburg, by his first wife Sophie Albertine, daughter of George Frederick, Count of Solms-Sonnenwalde.

After the death of his father in 1721, Victor Frederick succeeded him in Anhalt-Bernburg. As a Rittmeister and Capitan of the Prussian army, he was made a knight of the Order of the Black Eagle in 1722.

Victor Frederick showed a special interest for mining and metallurgy and often visited the mines in the Harz.

He died on 18 May 1765 in Bernburg.

Marriages and issue

In Dessau on 25 November 1724 Victor Frederick married Princess Louise of Anhalt-Dessau (b. Dessau, 21 August 1709 - d. Bernburg, 29 July 1732), daughter of Leopold I, Prince of Anhalt-Dessau. They had one daughter:
Sophie Louise (b. Bernburg, 29 June 1732 - d. Schloss Baruth, 6 October 1786), married on 20 May 1753 to Frederick, Count of Solms-Baruth.

In Potsdam on 22 May 1733 Victor Frederick married for a second time to Albertine of Brandenburg-Schwedt (b. Berlin, 21 April 1712 - d. Bernburg, 7 September 1750), daughter of Margrave Albert Frederick of Brandenburg-Schwedt. They had five children:
Frederick Albert, Prince of Anhalt-Bernburg (b. Bernburg, 15 August 1735 - d. Ballenstedt, 9 April 1796).
Charlotte Wilhelmine (b. Bernburg, 25 August 1737 - d. Sondershausen, 26 April 1777), married on 4 February 1760 to Christian Günther III, Prince of Schwarzburg-Sondershausen.
Marie Karoline (b. Bernburg, 9 June 1739 - d. Bernburg, 11 June 1739).
Fredericka Auguste Sophie (b. Ballenstedt, 28 August 1744 - d. Coswig, 12 April 1827), married on 27 May 1764 to Frederick Augustus, Prince of Anhalt-Zerbst.
Christine Elisabeth Albertine (b. Bernburg, 14 November 1746 - d. Coswig, 18 May 1823), married on 27 April 1762 to Augustus II, Prince of Schwarzburg-Sondershausen.

In Bernburg on 13 November 1750 Victor Frederick married morganatically for a third time to Konstanze Fredericka Schmidt, a commoner. She was ennobled and obtain the title of Baroness of Bähr (German: Frau von Bähr) in 1752, shortly before the birth of their only daughter:
Louise Fredericka Wilhelmine of Bähr (b. 4 May 1752 - d. 6 July 1820), married on 12 November 1768 to Otto Henry Louis, Count of Solms-Tecklenburg.

Princes of Anhalt-Bernburg
1700 births
1765 deaths
Burials at Schlosskirche St. Aegidien (Bernburg)